Godsell is a surname. Notable people with the surname include: 

Andrew Godsell (born 1964), British writer
Bobby Godsell (born 1952), South African businessman
Jack Godsell (born 1924), Scottish footballer
Richard Godsell (1880–1954), English cricketer
Sean Godsell (born 1960), Australian footballer and architect
Vanda Godsell (1922–1990), English actress